Frank Fingland (born 1928) was the commissioner of Yukon in Canada from November 1, 1978 until January 19, 1979. He was preceded by Arthur MacDonald Pearson and succeeded by Ione Jean Christensen.

Fingland adopted a First Nations son, John. His family, living in Ontario, moved to Yukon when Fingland was appointed Yukon's deputy minister of finance.

References

Commissioners of Yukon
1928 births
Living people